Chesty XII (born about 2002) is the former mascot of the United States Marine Corps from 2002 to 2008. A brindle and white male English Bulldog, he was named after Chesty Puller. Chesty XII was retired in 2008 and sent to live with two married members of the United States Marine Band "The President's Own". During his tenure as mascot, he was reported to have had a "spotty disciplinary record".

See also
 Jiggs II
 List of individual dogs

References

|-

|-

United States Marine Corps lore and symbols
Military animals
Individual dogs in the United States
American mascots